Baptiste Héguy (born 11 May 1998) is a French rugby union player, who currently plays as a flanker for the Top 14 club Bayonne.

Early life
He began playing rugby for his hometown club in 2012.

Club career
In 2019 and 2022, Héguy won the Pro D2 trophy with Bayonne and therefore experienced the promotion in the Top 14 twice.

International career
In 2018, Héguy won the Six Nations Under 20s Championship with France U20.

On 12 March 2023, he was called up to the France senior team for the first time for the 2023 Six Nations Championship final game against Wales.

Honours

Bayonne
 Pro D2: 2018–19, 2021–22

France U20
 Six Nations Under 20s Championship: 2018

References

External links
 Aviron Bayonnais
 EPCR
 All.Rugby
 It's Rugby 

Living people
1998 births
French rugby union players  
Rugby union flankers
Aviron Bayonnais players